Elizaveta  Nikolaevna Arzamasova (or less formally ; born March 17, 1995) is a Russian actress of theater, also known as TV-show anchorwoman.

Biography
Elizaveta Arzamasova was born in Moscow. In four years, she began to act in films. 
Liza played the main role in the musical "Annie" (director – Nina Chusova). In 2004, at the 9th theater festival Moscow Debuts the young actress was awarded the audience award for this role.
At the same time Liza was engaged in the music studio at the Russian Academy of Theatre Arts - GITIS. Then Liza's mother, Yuliya Arzamasova, placed on one of the sites photos and summaries of Liza. She got a call from the Moscow Variety Theatre, asked about her daughter and invited to audition.

In 2004, at the 9th theater festival "Moscow debuts" the young actress was awarded for the role of the Audience Choice Award.

Liza became popular after the TV series Daddy's Daughters, where she played one of the main roles – Galina Vasnetsova.

On January 30, 2010, at the age of 14 she played the role of Juliet in Romeo and Juliet on the stage of Moscow C.S. Stanislavski Drama Theatre.

Filmography

Films

TV Series

References

External links 

1995 births
Living people
Actresses from Moscow
Russian child actresses
Russian film actresses
Russian stage actresses
Russian television actresses
Russian voice actresses
21st-century Russian actresses
Russian television presenters
Russian women television presenters